The Cobb Power Station is a hydroelectric facility on the Cobb River,  northwest of Nelson, New Zealand. Since 2003, it has been owned and operated by Trustpower.

Cobb Power Station can be reached from Upper Tākaka via a sealed but winding and narrow  road along Tākaka River. The power station building is situated at the edge of Kahurangi National Park, with the reservoir located entirely within the national park, another  further up an unsealed steep and winding road.

See also 

Electricity sector in New Zealand
List of power stations in New Zealand

References

Further reading

 

Energy infrastructure completed in 1956
Hydroelectric power stations in New Zealand
Buildings and structures in the Tasman District